Harry Britt (June 8, 1938 – June 24, 2020) was an American political activist and politician in San Francisco. Britt was involved during the late-1960s in the civil rights movement when he was a Methodist minister in Chicago. He was first appointed to the San Francisco Board of Supervisors in January 1979 by Mayor Dianne Feinstein, succeeding Harvey Milk, who was assassinated in City Hall along with Mayor George Moscone by former Supervisor Dan White.

Career

San Francisco Board of Supervisors 
Britt served as President of the San Francisco Gay Democratic Club. Additionally, he was elected to the Board of Supervisors in November 1979, 1980, 1984, and 1988 and served as President of the Board of Supervisors from 1989 to 1990. Britt was one of a few members of the Democratic Socialists of America to be elected to public office.

Britt, who was openly gay, introduced domestic partner legislation in 1982, which was passed by the Board of Supervisors but vetoed by Mayor Feinstein. In 1989, under Britt's leadership, the board again passed domestic partner legislation, which was this time signed by Mayor Art Agnos. However, voters repealed the domestic partnership law by initiative; a modified version was reinstated by another voter initiative, 1990's Proposition K, also written by Britt.

Other campaigns 
Britt chose not to run for reelection in 1992. He ran unsuccessfully for California's 5th congressional district in 1987, narrowly losing to Nancy Pelosi in a special election to fill the seat left after the death of Sala Burton, winning 32 percent of the vote to Pelosi's 36 percent. He also was unsuccessful in his 2002 race against Mark Leno for a seat in the California State Assembly.

Later career 
Britt directed the Weekend BA Degree Completion Program at New College of California, which closed in January 2008 due to financial problems.

Death 
After a long illness, Britt died at Laguna Honda Hospital in San Francisco on June 24, 2020.

See also
List of Democratic Socialists of America who have held office in the United States

References

External links 
 New College of California website

1938 births
2020 deaths
20th-century American politicians
21st-century American politicians
Activists from California
California Democrats
Gay politicians
American LGBT city council members
LGBT people from the San Francisco Bay Area
American LGBT rights activists
Democratic Socialists of America politicians from California
New College of California faculty
People from Port Arthur, Texas
San Francisco Board of Supervisors members